Giuseppe Musolino (24 September 1876 – 22 January 1956), also known as the "Brigante Musolino" or the "King of Aspromonte", was an Italian brigand and folk hero.

Biography
Musolino was born in Santo Stefano in Aspromonte, in a rugged area of Calabria, in southern Italy.

He worked as a woodcutter in the Aspromonte area of Calabria, an isolated and mountainous region near the "toe" of the Italian "boot". On 24 September 1898, at the trial before the Assize Court of Reggio Calabria, despite the evidence brought by Musolino, the false testimonies of Rocco Zoccali and Stefano Crea, had helped sentence Musolino on 28 September to 21 years in prison for attempted murder. On 9 January 1899 he escaped from jail.

Musolino was captured by Carabinieri while heading to seek pardon from Victor Emmanuel III of Italy on 22 October 1901 in Acqualagna, near Urbino, He was tried and sent to life in prison on 11 July 1902. He remained in prison until 1946 when he developed mental illness, and was transferred to an asylum in Reggio Calabria where he died on 22 January 1956.

Musolino as legend

It can be said that Musolino was seen by his countrymen as a symbol of the injustice Calabria was facing at the time. As an elusive fugitive, always managing to escape traps, Musolino stirred the imagination of many people in Italy and in short order he became a legend throughout Italy and abroad. He became the subject of many Calabrian folk tales and popular songs. The 1950 film Il Brigante Musolino, by Mario Camerini, was based on his life. His real life events were also the subject of the concept-album Il Brigante Musolino by Otello Profazio.

See also 
Eric Hobsbawm's concept of the social bandit (see also Hobsbawm, Primitive Rebels, 1959)
Cesare Lombroso's "The Last Brigand" (1902)
  Dan Possumato's book (paperback edition) King of the Mountains. The Remarkable Story of Giuseppe Musolino, Italy's Most Famous Outlaw (2013) Kindle edition (2012), Audiobook Edition, read by Italian actor Edoardo Camponeschi (2014)

References

External links
"Musolino and the Law", from Old Calabria (1915) by Norman Douglas
 Arrestato il famoso e temutissimo brigante Musolino, La Domenica del Corriere del 27 ottobre 1901
 Il processo contro il brigante Musolino, La Domenica del Corriere del 4 maggio 1902
 Il rientro del bandito Musolino nel carcere, La Tribuna Illustrata del 4 maggio 1902

1876 births
1956 deaths
People from the Province of Reggio Calabria
Italian brigandage
Italian folklore